Kozłów Szlachecki is a village in the administrative district of Gmina Nowa Sucha, within Sochaczew County, Masovian Voivodeship, in east-central Poland.

External links
 Jewish Community in Kozłów Szlachecki on Virtual Shtetl

References

Villages in Sochaczew County